Ivey-Ellington House is a historic home located at Cary, Wake County, North Carolina.  The house was built about 1870 in the gothic cottage stye. It is a -story, "T"-plan, frame I-house with board-and-batten siding. It has a steeply pitched roof, decorative scalloped gable trim, and pointed-arch windows.

It was listed on the National Register of Historic Places in 2008. The Town of Cary entered a development agreement in 2019 that required the relocation of the building. The house was relocated from 135 W. Chatham St to 308 S. Academy St. on February 20, 2023. Rehabilitation of the house following the move is ongoing. The town plans to forgo the National Register designation after relocation to avoid any scrutiny for moving it into the existing Cary Historic District.

References

Houses on the National Register of Historic Places in North Carolina
Gothic Revival architecture in North Carolina
Houses completed in 1870
Houses in Wake County, North Carolina
National Register of Historic Places in Wake County, North Carolina